Exosphaeroma pentcheffi is a species of marine isopod of the family Sphaeromatidae.

Description
This species lacks strong sexual dimorphism, with both sexes possessing prominent dorsal tubercles. The largest male specimen measured 6.8 mm, while the largest female measured 4.6 mm.

Distribution and habitat
This species is known to inhabit the intertidal zone of the Palos Verdes Peninsula, Los Angeles, California.

Taxonomy
E. pentcheffi is named for Natural History Museum of Los Angeles County researcher N. Dean Pentcheff. Pentcheff led the field trip for an invertebrate zoology lab course at Loyola Marymount University during which the species was discovered.

References

Sphaeromatidae
Fauna of California
Crustaceans described in 2015